"Me Without You" is a song by Christian hip hop-rock-pop musician TobyMac from his fifth studio album, Eye On It. It was released on June 12, 2012, as the first single from the album. It was the No. 10 most played song on Air 1 for the week of June 2, 2012.

Track list

Background 
The song was written by TobyMac, David Arthur Garcia and Christopher Stevens, and the song was produced by TobyMac and Garcia.

Release 
"Me Without You" was digitally released as the lead single from Eye On It on June 12, 2012.

Music video 
There is an official lyric video for "Me Without You" on YouTube. The official music video was released in 2013. The video shows Toby's son Truett turning on a video game console when suddenly his father appears on the screen singing the song.

Remixes
"Me Without You" has been remixed by several groups including Capital Kings and Telemitry.

Charts

Weekly charts

Year-end charts

Certifications

References 

YouTube link to listen to "Me Without You": https://www.youtube.com/watch?v=xLYRTrdo5As

2012 singles
TobyMac songs
Songs written by TobyMac
Songs written by Christopher Stevens (musician)
ForeFront Records singles
2012 songs
Songs written by David Garcia (musician)